The following List of Activision games: 2010–2019 is a portion of the List of Activision video games.

References

External links
List of Activision games from MobyGames

Activision